Kozelshchyna Raion (translit.: Kozelshchynskyi raion) was a raion (district) in Poltava Oblast in central Ukraine. The raion's administrative center was the urban-type settlement of Kozelshchyna. The other urban-type settlement in the raion was Nova Haleshchyna. The raion was abolished and its territory was merged into Kremenchuk Raion on 18 July 2020 as part of the administrative reform of Ukraine, which reduced the number of raions of Poltava Oblast to four. The last estimate of the raion population was 

Important rivers within the Kozelshchyna Raion include the Psel.

Settlements

References

External links

  Kozelshchyna Raion official website

Former raions of Poltava Oblast
1923 establishments in Ukraine
Ukrainian raions abolished during the 2020 administrative reform